Wilhelm Aschwanden (born 18 December 1969) is a Swiss cross-country skier who competed from 1992 to 2004. Competing in three Winter Olympics, he earned his best career and individual finishes at Nagano in 1998 with a sixth in the 4 × 10 km relay and a 22nd in the 50 km event, respectively.

Aschwanden's best finish at the FIS Nordic World Ski Championships was 26th in the 30 km event at Trondheim in 1997. His best World Cup finish was tenth in a 10 km event in Italy in 1998.

Aschwanden earned thirteen career victories at lesser events up to 50 km from 2001 to 2004.

World Cup results
All results are sourced from the International Ski Federation (FIS).

World Cup standings

References

External links

Olympic 4 x 10 km relay results: 1936-2002 

1969 births
Living people
Cross-country skiers at the 1994 Winter Olympics
Cross-country skiers at the 1998 Winter Olympics
Cross-country skiers at the 2002 Winter Olympics
Olympic cross-country skiers of Switzerland
Swiss male cross-country skiers